Sternitta is a genus of moths of the family Erebidae erected by Michael Fibiger in 2011.

Species
Sternitta parasuffuscalis Fibiger, 2011
Sternitta suffuscalis (Swinhoe, 1886)
Sternitta hackeri Fibiger, 2011
Sternitta gregerseni Fibiger, 2011
Sternitta goateri Fibiger, 2011
Sternitta gabori Fibiger, 2011
Sternitta magna Fibiger, 2011

References

Micronoctuini
Moth genera